Jogindernagar, or Jogindar Nagar, is a municipality, and a sub district in Mandi district in the Indian state of Himachal Pradesh. Named after Raja Joginder Sen, the hill station is the terminus of the  Kangra Valley narrow-gauge railway. Jogindernagar is the third-largest city in the Mandi district. The only city in Asia with three hydro-electric power stations, its nickname is "The City of Powerhouses".

Situated in the central Joginder Nagar Valley, this region is known for paragliding and trekking, mountain biking and camping. The valley is known for its Ts: trolley, trout and train. In 2015, Jogindernagar was declared the first free Wi-Fi city in Himachal Pradesh.

Etymology
Jogindernagar was named after the Mandi king Raja Joginder Sen. Its original name was Sukrahatti.

History
In 1925, Raja Joginder Sen and Col. B. C. Batty planned a hydropower scheme near the village of Sukrahatti. Alexander Sanderson was chief engineer until December 1929, when he returned to England with the project half-completed. Narrow-gauge railway track was laid from Pathankot to Jogindernagar—about —to carry heavy machinery transported from Britain. A haulage system was laid from the Shanan Power House site to Barot, where a reservoir was built on the Uhl River. After tunneling and piping the water several kilometres from the river to Jogindernagar, the 110-MW Shanan Power House was built by a team of engineers headed by Batty. It was the only hydroelectric project in northern India which fed undivided Punjab and Delhi.

The hydroelectric scheme planned to build five power stations with water from the Uhl River. Water from the Shanan Power House was be by tunnels  to adjoining Siyuri Dhar. A reservoir was be built in the village of Chapprot to drive turbines at the base of Chapprot Hill in stage two of the project. However, the plan was abandoned after Batty's death.

During the 1960s, the Himachal Pradesh State Electricity Board revived the plan. Another set of turbines was added at Bassi (a small village at the bottom of Chapprot Hill) in 1970, and the 66-MW Bassi Power House was built. Despite the Bassi Power House's economy (since it was based on tailwater from the Shanan project), no further development was made until the beginning of the 21st century.
Construction of the project's third stage, the 100-MW Uhl Stage III, is ongoing in the village of Chulla (near Tullah) with two reservoirs: one near Machhyal Lake and another in the village of Raktal (near Chulla).

Until the mid-20th century, Jogindernagar was northern India's largest potato market. The potato-growing valleys were not linked by roads; over 2,000 mules from the Lahaul and Spiti valleys transported potatoes from outlying areas to Jogindernagar, the only railhead in that part of the state. Potatoes from Mandi, Kullu and Lahaul and Spiti districts were brought there for transport to West Bengal.

Rock salt

Jogindernagar was India's only supplier of rock salt, obtained from the Gumma and Drang mines. Residents of the Kullu Valley travelled for days to obtain the salt, crossing the high-altitude Bhubhu Pass (since the road network did not yet exist).

These mines were started in May 1963 and closed in January 2011, due to non-forest clearance from the environment and forest ministry and non-deposit of royalty by the company. However, after re-commissioning in March 2016, the rock salt mine was extracting around 1,500 tonnes of salt every year from Maigal, Darang and Gumma mines.

Geography
Jogindernagar is in the central Joginder Nagar Valley, in the north-western Himalayas. Surrounded by mountains, it has an average elevation of 1,220 metres (4,000 feet).

Its surrounding mountains are covered with dense pine forests. Rhododendron (burans, known locally as brah ka fool) and deodar trees are found at high-altitude locations such as Winch Camp, Jhatingri and Phuladhar. Jogindernagar is in a Zone V (very high earthquake-damage risk) region, and after-effects of the 1905 earthquake are still visible at the nearby Kila Karanpur fort.

Climate
The climate is warm and temperate; summer is much rainier than winter. According to the Köppen climate classification, Jogindernagar has a humid subtropical climate (Cwa).

Demographics

Population
As per 2022 estimates, the population of the Jogindernagar sub district or tehsil is 108,122 including 214 urban and rural locations. The combined population of Vidhan Sabha constituency inclusive of two sub districts viz. Jogindernagar (108,122) and Lad Bharol (33,065) is 141,187. 

According to the 2011 Census of India, the Jogindernagar sub district had a population of 84,470, of which 41,245 were male and 43,225 were female showing a population growth of 28 percent when compared to 2022 figure. While, the notified municipality had a population of 5,335 and is divided into seven wards, for which elections are held every five years.

Literacy
Jogindarnagar's literacy rate is 87.86 percent, higher than the Himachal Pradesh average of 82.80%. Male literacy is 92.63 percent, and female literacy is 82.99 percent.

Religion
The major religion is Hinduism; a small percentage of the population follows Islam, Sikhism, Christianity and Tibetan Buddhism. A Tibetan Buddhist community (including monks) lives in the nearby village of Chauntra.

Languages
The major languages spoken in the region are Hindi and the Western Pahari varieties of Mandyali and the Kangri dialect. Most residents also speak English.

Cityscape 
The urban agglomeration (UA) including around 50 urban and suburban areas is spread across the slopy plains of Joginder Nagar valley within an area of 60 square kilometers. The combined population of Joginder Nagar UA is estimated at around 50,000 as of 2023. Rest of the population of around 60,000 lies in steep hills and rural areas mostly in the form of villages.

Major Suburbs 

 Luxmi Bazaar
 College Area
 Samlot
 Upper Seri
 Lower Seri
 Shanan
 Garoru
 Jhalwan
 Balakrupi
 Masoli
 Aarthi
 Jalpeher
 Dhelu
 Dheluhar
 Dohag
 Bharyara
 Harabagh
 Harganen
 Machyal
 Majharanu
 Ner Gharwasda
 Palhoon
 Dhrun
 Chattar
 Bassi
 Yora
 Jimjema
 Ghamrehar
 Majhwar
 Dart Bagla
 Banaee
 Dibhnoo
 Khuddar

Other Suburbs

 Bhararu
 Chauntra
 Sarli
 Sukhabag
 Ahju
 Ladruhi
 Dakbadga
 Sainthal
 Kohra
 Bhaterh
 Sarohli
 Raja
 Sagnehr  
 Tikroo
 Tikri Musehra
 Machkehr
 Talkehr
 Bhankher
 Badehr
 Bhatwara
 Matru
 Hardbheru

Nearest cities and major transport hubs
 Mandi: 
 Chandigarh: 
 Shimla: 
 Delhi: 
 Palampur: 
 Pathankot: 
 Kotli: 
 Sarkaghat: 
 Nearest broad-gauge train station: Pathankot:  
 Nearest airport: Gaggal Airport,

Transport

Air
Jogindernagar's nearest airport is Gaggal Airport at a distance of 75 kilometers from the city center, officially known as Kangra Airport.

Rail

Joginder Nagar railway station is the terminus of the  Kangra Valley Railway, which runs to Pathankot. The nearest broad-gauge station is the Pathankot Junction railway station.

Road
National Highway 154 connects Jogindernagar with Mandi and Pathankot. This road is expected to be upgraded into a four-lane highway for which work has already started.

The Jogindernagar-Sarkaghat-Ghumarwin state highway 19 connects these three towns via a well maintained double lane highway running southwards.

Education
The region lacks any known higher educational engineering and medical institutions leading to the migration of students to larger cities after schooling. However, some of the prominent institutions of education, medicine, and research in the region are:
 Rajiv Gandhi Memorial Government College, Joginder Nagar
 HP Revenue Training Institute, Masoli
 Research Institute in Indian Systems of Medicine (Herbal Garden and Museum), Joginder Nagar
 Government Circle Ayurvedic Hospital, Joginder Nagar
 College of Ayurvedic Pharmaceutical Sciences, Shanan
 Industrial Training Institute, Dohag
 Neelam College of Education, Zimzima Road
 Himalayan Group of Professional Institutions Nursing College, Joginder Nagar
 Jai Durga Maa Nursing College, Bridge Mandi
 DAV Public School, Joginder Nagar
 Dayanand Bhartiya Public Senior Secondary School, Joginder Nagar
 Government Senior Secondary School (Boys), Joginder Nagar
 Government Senior Secondary School (Girls), Joginder Nagar
 Mount Maurya International School, Jhalwan
 New Crescent Senior Secondary Public School, Lower Garoru

Points of interest

A trolley track goes from Winch Camp to Head Gear (2,500 meters), and the funicular descends to Barot. Currently non-operational, the  narrow-gauge track from Winch Camp to Head Gear is India's highest railway track.

 Barot: Contains the main Uhl River reservoirs for the Shanan and Bassi hydroelectric projects.
 Bir-Billing: Bir is home to Tibetan Buddhist monasteries. At , Billing is a paragliding and hang gliding take-off spot. It hosted the 2015 Paragliding World Cup. 
 Shanan Power House: India's first megawatt hydroelectric power project, commissioned in 1932
 Kangra Valley Railway: The narrow-gauge railway runs between Pathankot and Jogindernagar. Passing through two tunnels, the railway is on UNESCO's tentative list to be added to its mountain railways of India World Heritage Site.

 Dehnasar Lake: High-altitude lake in the Dhauladhar range
 Banderi Temple and Kila Karanpur: Banderi Temple is on the hill to the north-west of Jogindernagar. Kila Karanpur is the abandoned fort of Raja Karan Sen, son of Raja Joginder Sen.
 Macchial Lake: Lake which is considered sacred
 Herbal Garden and Museum: North India's largest herbal garden and institute for research of Ayurvedic medicine and plants
 Dhelu: Paragliding take-off spot for instruction and solo or tandem flights
 Dzongsar Khyentse Monastery: One of six Buddhist monasteries and schools in nearby Chauntra village exemplifies Tibetan architecture and religious practice.
 Chaina Pass: Mountain pass at  connects Barot Valley at Rajgundha to Joginder Nagar Valley at Billing and the adjacent Kangra Valley.
 Batty Pass: Named after B. C. Batty, this mid-altitude  pass parallels haulage rail track to connect Jogindernagar Valley (near Winch Camp) to Barot Valley at Headgear.

Notable residents
 Ram Swaroop Sharma, Former Member of Parliament from Mandi
 Gulab Singh Thakur, former Himachal Pradesh speaker and cabinet minister
 Prakash Rana, current MLA of Jogindernagar, and Industrialist (one of the richest MLAs in India)

Gallery

References

External links
 
 Discovery Channel's "World's Toughest Trucker" in Joginder Nagar
 Himachal Tourism Dep. Co.
 Himachal Tourism Department India
 Tibetan Children's Village
 Tibetan Children's Village, Chauntra

 
Cities and towns in Mandi district
Geography of Mandi district